I Morti non pagano tasse is a 1952 Italian comedy film by  Sergio Grieco.

Cast
 Tino Scotti: 	Marco Vecchietti / Giovanni Rossi
 Titina De Filippo: 	Geltrude 
 Carlo Campanini:	Il sindaco
 Clelia Matania: 	La signora Vecchietti
 Aroldo Tieri: 	Nicola 
 Tino Buazzelli: 	Arturo
 Franca Marzi: 	Mariella
 Vinicio Sofia: 	Il direttore generale 
 Guglielmo Inglese 	 
 Luigi Bonos

External links
 

1952 films
1950s Italian-language films
Films directed by Sergio Grieco
Italian comedy films
1952 comedy films
1950s Italian films